The Church of St. Lucy in Jurandvor near Baška, Krk, Croatia is a Romanesque Catholic church from the year 1100 with two major medieval Croatian artifacts: the Baška Tablet, and a checkerboard-pattern carving on the bell tower that is suspected to be one of the first instances of the Croatian coat of arms.

References

1100 establishments in Europe
Churches in Croatia
11th century in Croatia
Krk
Romanesque architecture in Croatia
11th-century establishments in Croatia
Buildings and structures in Primorje-Gorski Kotar County